The Navajo Sandstone Group is a geologic group in Utah. It preserves fossils dating back to the Jurassic period.

See also

 List of fossiliferous stratigraphic units in Utah
 Paleontology in Utah

References
 

Geologic groups of Utah
Jurassic System of North America